This list of Karaite Jews consists of notable individuals who are associated with Karaite Judaism. It includes not only those individuals who were explicitly a part of a Karaite community, but also those Jews who held Karaite or proto-Karaite views. The association of each individual with Karaite Judaism must be explained in that individual's entry.

Proto-Karaite period (before 700 CE) 
 Judah ben Tabbai, Pharisee scholar, Chief Justice of the Sanhedrin, one of "the Pairs" of Jewish leaders who lived in first century BCE.

Early Karaite period — 8th–9th centuries (700–899 CE) 
 ‘Anan ben David, founder of the Annanites which would later be absorbed into Kara'ism
 Benjamin al-Nahawandi, regarded by some as the proper originator of Kara'ism as it has come down through the ages
 Abu 'Imran Musa al-Za'farani al-Tiflisi, a 9th-century founder of Karaite sect of the Tiflisites

Golden Age — 10th–12th centuries (900–1199 CE) 
 Aharon ben Mosheh ben Asher (died c.960 CE), refiner of the Tiberian writing system, regarded as having produced the most accurate version of the Masoretic Text
 Daniel al-Qumisi, Kara'ite scholar, polemicist, proto-Zionist, and compiler of the legal code Sefer ha-Mitzvot
 Hasun ben Mashiach, scholar who flourished in Egypt (or Babylonia) in the first half of the tenth century
 Ya'akov Qirqisani aka al-Kirkisani, dogmatist, author, and exegete of the early 10th century
 Yehudah Hadasi, 12th century scholar, philosopher, and grammarian from Constantinople
 Solomon ben Jeroham, exegete and controversialist
 Yefet ben Ali, Babylonian commentator on the Bible

Middle period — 13th–17th century (1200–1699 CE) 
 Aaron ben Elijah of Nicomedia (1328/9–1369), perhaps the most prominent Kara'ite theologian, considered the Kara'ite equivalent of his rabbinic contemporary, Maimonides
 Elijah Bashyazi (1420–1490), Hakham who codified Karaite laws
 Caleb Afendopolo (1430–1499), Hakham and polyhistor. 
 Moses ben Elijah Bashyazi (1537–1555), wrote many Karaite books 
 Yiṣḥaq b. Avraham of Troki, 16th century Lithuanian Kara'ite philosopher and writer who wrote the important apology or defense of Judaism vis-a-vis Christianity entitled Ḥizzuq Emunah (Fortification of Faith)
 Mordecai Sultansky (1772–1862), prominent scholar who wrote about angelology and the origin of Karaite Jews

Early-modern era — 18th–19th centuries (1700–1947 CE) 
 Abram Samoilovitch Besicovitch (1891–1970), Russian-English mathematician
 Adolph Joffe (1883–1927), Russian communist revolutionary, Bolshevik politician, Soviet diplomat
 Avraham Firkovich, famous leader of the Crimean Karaites, a very important collector of manuscripts, who was an amateur archeologist
 Shlomo ben Afeda Ha-Kohen (1826–1893), considered the last sage of the Constantinopolitan Karaites
 Solomon Krym (1864–1936), deputy in the Russian Duma
 Samuel Maykapar (1867–1938), Soviet composer
 Seraya Shapshal (1873–1961), ḥakham of the Lithuanian Karaite community
 Sima Babovich (1790–1855), ḥakham of the Crimean Karaites

Current-modern era — 20th–21st centuries (1948 CE–present) 

 Mordecai Alfandari (1929–1999), Ḥakham, known as the restorer of Karaism; in the years 1956-1958 published a Karaite bulletin in Hebrew called "Ha'Or" ("The Light"); he is also the author of studies on the Light of Israel website.
 Melech ben Ya'aqov, Ḥakham of the World Alliance of Qara'im and maintains the website Karaite Insights
 Moshe ben Yosef Firrouz, former Chief Ḥakham and Vice-Chancellor of Karaite Jewish University, maintains the website Universal Karaite Judaism
 Avraham Kefeli, Ḥazzan in Ashdod, Israel
 Moshe Marzouk (1926–1955), Egyptian Karaite Jew, hanged by Egypt for his participation in Israel's Operation Suzannah, also called the Lavon Affair
 Joe Pessah, Congregation leader of congregation B'nai Y'Israel in Daly City, California
 Avraham Qanaï (1946–2021), Ḥakham of the Karaite congregation “Oraḥ Ṣaddiqim” in Albany, New York
 Meir Rekhavi, Ḥakham and co-founder of the World Karaite Movement, holds the position of Chancellor for the Karaite Jewish University
 Leonard “LAS RUDO” Ewaleifo, Artist and Businessman, Founder and Chief executive of IMH Societe Anonyme

 
Karaite
Jews,Karaite